David Beaglehole (8 January 1938 – 21 March 2014) was a New Zealand physicist.

Early life, family and education
Beaglehole was born in Wellington in 1938 into an academic family. His parents were American-born linguist Pearl Beaglehole (née Malsin) and her husband Ernest Beaglehole, a psychologist and ethnologist, who had met while they were both studying at the London School of Economics. His uncle was historian John Beaglehole.

Educated at Wellington College from 1951 to 1954, he then studied physics, chemistry and psychology at Victoria University College, graduating with a Bachelor of Science in 1958 and a Master of Science with first-class honours in 1960. He then carried out doctoral research into the optical properties of copper and gold in the far ultraviolet at Trinity College, Cambridge under Tom Faber, and was awarded his PhD in 1963.

He had three children with his wife Ann Beaglehole; after their marriage ended, he had another child with his long-term partner Bhagee Ramanathan.

Academic career
After post-doctoral research at the University of Chicago from 1964 to 1966, Beaglehole was an assistant professor and then associate professor at the University of Maryland.  He returned to Victoria University of Wellington in 1969 as professor of physical electronics, and began research into condensed matter physics and astronomy at the university. He also developed an improved ellipsometric method for measuring the thickness of liquid interfaces, which led to the establishment of Beaglehole Instruments in 1993.

Beaglehole was elected a Fellow of the Royal Society of New Zealand in 1992.

References

1938 births
2014 deaths
New Zealand physicists
People from Wellington City
People educated at Wellington College (New Zealand)
Victoria University of Wellington alumni
Alumni of Trinity College, Cambridge
University of Maryland, College Park faculty
Academic staff of the Victoria University of Wellington
Fellows of the Royal Society of New Zealand
20th-century physicists
21st-century physicists
New Zealand people of American descent
David